Valle de Tobalina is a municipality located in the province of Burgos, Castile and León, northern Spain.   (data from INE), the municipality has a population of 1,069 inhabitants.

The capital of the municipality is the village of Quintana-Martín Galíndez.

References

Municipalities in the Province of Burgos